This is a list of gardens in Italy. The Italian garden is stylistically based on symmetry, axial geometry and on the principle of imposing order over nature. It influenced the history of gardening, especially French gardens and English gardens. The Italian garden was influenced by Roman gardens and Italian Renaissance gardens.

A
 Arboreto di Arco
 Arboreto Pascul
 Arboretum Apenninicum

B

 Bardini Gardens
 Biennale Gardens 
 Boboli Gardens

C
 Cortile del Belvedere

D
 Ducal Palace of Colorno
 Ducal Palace of Sassuolo

F
 Farnese Gardens
 La Foce

G
 

 Garden of Eden
 Garden of Ninfa
 Gardens of Augustus
 Gardens of Bomarzo
 Gardens of Lucullus
 Gardens of Maecenas
 Giardini della Biennale
 Giardini della rotonda di Padova
 Giardini Papadopoli
 Giardini Ravino
 Giardino Alpino "Antonio Segni"
 Giardino dei Semplici
 Giardino dell'Iris
 Giardino delle Rose
 Giardino Montano dell' Orecchiella
 Giardino Montano Linasia

I

 Isola Bella (Lago Maggiore)
 Isola del Garda
 Isola Madre

L
 Lowe Gardens

M

 Minerva's Garden
 Moreno Gardens
 La Mortella

O
 Orange Garden

P

 Palace of Portici 
 Palazzo Giusti 
 Palazzo Pfanner
 Pallanca exotic gardens

 Parco Giardino Sigurtà
 Park of the Monsters
 The Parks of Genoa

R
 Royal Palace of Caserta

T

 Tarot Garden
 Torrecchia Vecchia
 Trauttmansdorff Castle Gardens

V

 Varramista Gardens
 Villa Aldobrandini
 Villa Arrighetti
 Villa Barbarigo (Valsanzibio)  
 Villa Borghese gardens
 Villa Carlotta 
 Villa Cetinale
 Villa Cicogna Mozzoni
 Villa Cimbrone
 Villa d'Este
 Villa del Balbianello
 Villa Della Porta Bozzolo
 Villa di Castello
 Villa di Corliano
 Villa di Pratolino 
 Villa di Quarto
 Villa Durazzo-Pallavicini
 Villa Gamberaia 
 Villa Lancellotti 
 Villa Lante
 Villa Ludovisi
 Villa Marlia
 Villa Massei
 Villa Medici at Cafaggiolo 
 Villa Medici at Careggi 
 Villa Medici in Fiesole 
 Villa Palmieri
 Villa San Michele

W
 Winter Gardens

See also
 List of botanical gardens in Italy
 List of Grandi Giardini Italiani
 List of garden types
 Giardino all'italiana
 Italian Renaissance garden

 01
 
Italy
Gardens